The 1954 United States Senate election in Alabama was held on November 2, 1954. 

Incumbent Senator John Sparkman was re-elected to a second term in office over Republican Junius Foy Guin Jr.

Democratic primary

Candidates
 Laurie C. Battle, U.S. Representative from Birmingham
 John G. Crommelin, retired U.S. Navy Rear Admiral and white supremacist
 William C. Irby
 John Sparkman, incumbent Senator and 1952 nominee for Vice President

Results

General election

Results

See also 
 1954 United States Senate elections

References 

1954
Alabama
United States Senate